Rhynchoconger is a genus of eels in the family Congridae.

Species
 Rhynchoconger ectenurus (D. S. Jordan & R. E. Richardson, 1909)
 Rhynchoconger flavus (Goode & T. H. Bean, 1896) (Yellow conger)
 Rhynchoconger gracilior (Ginsburg, 1951) (Whiptail conger)
 Rhynchoconger guppyi (Norman, 1925)
 Rhynchoconger humbermariorum (Tommasi, 1960) (Species inquirenda) 
 Rhynchoconger nitens (D. S. Jordan & Bollman, 1890) (Bignose conger)
 Rhynchoconger squaliceps (Alcock, 1894)
 Rhynchoconger trewavasae Ben-Tuvia, 1993

References

Congridae
Ray-finned fish genera
Taxa named by David Starr Jordan
Taxa named by Carl Leavitt Hubbs